Oceanside High School is an American public high school located in Oceanside, New York, United States. It is part of the Oceanside School District.

History 
The school was Initially built on Merle Avenue, but moved to its current location on Skillman Avenue in 1955 and expanded to its current size in 1962. The school features some of the best, and highest paid  teachers on Long Island. The school's mascot is the Sailor and teams compete countywide in a variety of sports. The principal is Geraldine DiCarlo, who was promoted from Associate Principal and replaced Mark Secaur in 2013. The Broadcast Program has collaborated with MSG Varsity, as most local schools have, and has been featured on some of their programming.

Academics 
Oceanside High School was ranked #424 in America in 2012.

Demographics 
As of the 2014–15 school year, the school had an enrollment of 1,782 students and 130.1 classroom teachers (on an FTE basis), for a student–teacher ratio of 13.7:1. There were 152 students (8.5% of enrollment) eligible for free lunch and 32 (1.8% of students) eligible for reduced-cost lunch.

Athletics 
Its football team, the Oceanside Sailors, went to the Long Island County championship in the 2015 season and again in their 2017 season.

Notable alumni
Samantha Cesario, American figure skater
Jay Fiedler, former American football quarterback in the National Football League (NFL)
 Art Heyman (1941–2012), American basketball player
Bob Iger (born 1951, class of 1969), chairman and chief executive officer (CEO) of The Walt Disney Company
Dennis Leonard (born 1951), pitcher for the Kansas City Royals in the late 1970s and early 1980s
David Paymer (born 1954), actor, comedian, and television director
Randy Levine (born 1955), attorney and the president of the New York Yankees baseball club
Stephen Robert Morse (born 1985), journalist and film director/producer
Nicky Polanco (born 1980), lacrosse player
Marian Thurm (born 1952), author of short stories and novels

References

External links
Oceanside High School website

Public high schools in New York (state)
Schools in Nassau County, New York
1890 establishments in New York (state)